Located at Trago Mills Regional Shopping Centre, Newton Abbot, the  ridable miniature railway Bickington Steam Railway was opened in 1988, using equipment recovered from the Suffolk Wildlife Park, which itself was taken from Rudyard Lake.

See also
 Trago Mills

References

 Bickington Steam Railway

External links

 http://www.trago.co.uk Trago Mills Website

Rail transport in Devon
Miniature railways in the United Kingdom
10¼ in gauge railways in England
Railway lines opened in 1988